Antonis Georgiades was Minister of Communications and Works in Cyprus from 6 April 1959 to 15 August 1960.

References

External links
 Profile of Antonis Georgiadis. Britain's Small Wars. Retrieved 17 April 2013.

Greek Cypriot people
Cyprus Ministers of Communications and Works
Year of birth missing (living people)
Living people